The Diocese of Bondo may refer to;

Anglican Diocese of Bondo, in Bondo, Kenya
Roman Catholic Diocese of Bondo, in Bondo, Democratic Republic of the Congo